Hebe Uhart (2 December 1936 – 11 October 2018) was an Argentine writer. In 2017, she received the Manuel Rojas Ibero-American Narrative Award.

Career
Of her childhood and relationship with books, Hebe Uhart relates:

She studied Philosophy at the University of Buenos Aires (UBA). Later she worked as a teacher, both at primary and secondary level, and university at the UBA and the National University of Lomas de Zamora.

She lived in Buenos Aires, where she gave literary workshops. She was a frequent contributor to newspapers and magazines, such as El País in Montevideo.

Her stories were adapted into the play Querida mamá o guiando la hiedra, directed by Laura Yusem.

In 2010 she published a compilation of her short stories and novels from 1962 to 2004 in the volume Relatos reunidos.

Works
Uhart's works have been collected in numerous anthologies.

Awards and distinctions
 2004 – Konex Award Merit Diploma, in the category "Cuento: quinquenio 1999–2003"
 2011 – Book Foundation Award for Best Argentine Book of Literary Creation, for Relatos reunidos
 2014 – Konex Award Merit Diploma, in the category "Cuento: quinquenio 2004–2008"
 2015 – Fondo Nacional de las Artes Prize
 2017 – Manuel Rojas Ibero-American Narrative Award

References

External links

"Guiding the Ivy," by Hebe Uhart, trans. Maureen Shaughnessy, Asymptote, January 2013.

1936 births
2018 deaths
20th-century Argentine women writers
20th-century Argentine writers
21st-century Argentine women writers
21st-century Argentine writers
20th-century Argentine short story writers
21st-century Argentine short story writers
Argentine women novelists
Argentine women short story writers
People from Moreno Partido
University of Buenos Aires alumni
Academic staff of the University of Buenos Aires
20th-century Argentine novelists
21st-century Argentine novelists